The Hidden Hand was an American stoner/doom band from Maryland, formed in 2002.

Biography
The Hidden Hand was a trio formed by Scott "Wino" Weinrich (guitar and vocals) and  Bruce Falkinburg (bass and vocals) and included 3 different drummers. Weinrich had previously been a member of such bands as The Obsessed, Saint Vitus, Spirit Caravan and Place of Skulls.  Falkinburg was a professional recording engineer and his Phase Studios has been the commission site of works by Clutch, Sixty Watt Shaman and Stinking Lizaveta. The Hidden Hand released their debut 7" single De-Sensitized in late 2002 and was quickly followed by their first album, Divine Propaganda in 2003. A split LP/CD with Washington, D.C. band Wooly Mammoth followed. The release coincided with their appearance at the Emissions from the Monolith festival. Their second full-length album: Mother Teacher Destroyer was released on Southern Lord Records in 2004. After the release of that second LP original drummer Dave Hennessy left the band to focus more time on his own band: Ostinato. He was replaced by Evan Tanner. Tanner left the band in 2006 after the recording of their latest effort, The Resurrection of Whiskey Foote. He in turn was replaced by Matt Moulis, who has played in DC area bands Medic and Bison.

The output of Hidden Hand  is a slight departure in style for Weinrich.  Its psychedelic influences are evident and lyrically the band deals with: politics, history and spirituality. In contrast to his previous bands Wino has said that: "The Hidden Hand is political".

Hidden Hand split up in August 2007.

Members
Scott "Wino" Weinrich – guitar, vocals
Bruce Falkinburg – bass, vocals
Matt Moulis – drums
Dave Hennessy – drums
Evan Tanner – drums

Discography

Albums
Divine Propaganda CD/LP (MeteorCity Records/Exile On Mainstream Records(UK)/Beard of Stars Records (LP) 2003)
Mother Teacher Destroyer CD/LP (Southern Lord Records/Exile On Mainstream Records(UK) 2004)
The Resurrection of Whiskey Foote CD/LP (Southern Lord Records 2007/Doomentia Records (LP) 2009)

EPs
"De-sensitized" 7" (McCarthyism Records 2002)
Night Letters CDEP/12"EP split with Wooly Mammoth (MeteorCity Records/McCarthyism Records 2004)
Devoid of Colour CDEP (Southern Lord Records 2005)

Compilation appearances
 "Rebellion" on Doom Capital CD (2004 Crucial Blast Records)
 "Falconstone" on High Volume (The Stoner Rock Collection) CD (2004 High Times Records)
 "Half Mast" on Music from Time and Space Vol. 11 CD (2004 Sysyphus Records)
 "Someday Soon" on Darkness Knows No Boundaries CD (2006 Southern Lord Records)
 "Vulcans' Children" on Darkness Hath No Boundaries CD (2006 Southern Lord Records)
 "Five Points" on ...And Back to Earth Again. Ten Years of MeteorCity 3CD (2007 MeteorCity Records)
 "Dark Horizons" on Within the Church of Thee Overlords CD (2007 Southern Lord Records)
 "Coffin Lily" on Worship the Riff CD (2007 Exile on Mainstream)

References

External links
 MeteorCity

American doom metal musical groups
Heavy metal musical groups from Maryland
American stoner rock musical groups
American musical trios
Musical groups established in 2002
Musical groups disestablished in 2007
2002 establishments in Maryland
2007 disestablishments in Maryland